Cangetta is a genus of moths of the family Crambidae.

Species
Cangetta albiceps (Hampson, 1917) (from South Africa)
Cangetta albocarnea Warren, 1896
Cangetta ammochroa Turner, 1815
Cangetta aurantiaca Hampson, 1906
Cangetta cervinalis Caradja & Meyrick, 1934
Cangetta eschatia J. F. G. Clarke, 1986
Cangetta fulviceps (Hampson, 1917) (from Malawi)
Cangetta furvitermen (Hampson, 1917) (from Malawi)
Cangetta haematera (Turner, 1937)
Cangetta hartoghialis (Snellen, 1872) (from Congo)
Cangetta homoperalis Hampson, 1899
Cangetta micralis (Hampson, 1907)
Cangetta murinalis Snellen, 1901
Cangetta primulina (Hampson, 1916) (from Cameroon)

Former species
Cangetta tridentalis (Snellen, 1872)

References
afromoths.net 

Spilomelinae
Crambidae genera
Taxa named by Frederic Moore